The number of notable protein-ligand docking programs currently available is high and has been steadily increasing over the last decades. The following list presents an overview of the most common notable programs, listed alphabetically, with indication of the corresponding year of publication, involved organisation or institution, short description, availability of a webservice and the license. This table is comprehensive but not complete.

References

External links

Structural bioinformatics software
Molecular modelling software
Computational chemistry software
Lists of software